The Impulse to Progress and Democracy is a political party in Benin. 
At the last legislative elections, 30 March 2003, the party was member of the Presidential Movement, the alliance of supporters of Mathieu Kérékou, who had won the 2001 presidential elections, and won 2 out of 83 seats.

Political parties in Benin
Political parties with year of establishment missing